Craig Miner is a Republican former member of the Connecticut Senate, representing the 30th District from 2017-2023.

Career 
In 1989, Miner was the owner/operator of Litchfield Hills Filling Station until 1998.

Miner was the former State Senator for the 30th Senate District from 2017-2023, representing part of Fairfield and Litchfield Counties in the Connecticut Senate, including the towns of Brookfield, Canaan, Cornwall, Goshen, Kent, Litchfield, Morris, New Milford, North Canaan, Salisbury, Sharon, Torrington, Warren and Winchester. Prior to his election to the Senate, Miner had served eight terms as the state representative to the 66th House District.

Personal life 
Miner's wife is Margy. He had three children Justin, Heather and Katie.

See also
Connecticut Senate

References

Republican Party Connecticut state senators
Living people
Year of birth missing (living people)
21st-century American politicians
Politicians from Litchfield, Connecticut